South Korea competed at the 1997 World Championships in Athletics from August 2 to 10. A team of 9 athletes was announced in preparation for the competition.

Results

Men

Women

References
1997 championship Results. 

World Championships in Athletics
1997
Nations at the 1997 World Championships in Athletics